Laconia or Lakonia may refer to:

Places
 Laconia, a region of Greece
 Loconia, a village in Apulia, Italy

United States 
 Laconia, Indiana
 Laconia, New Hampshire
 Laconia, Tennessee

Ships
 , 1911–1917, sunk in the First World War
  1921–1942, sunk in the Second World War
 Laconia incident, sinking of RMS Laconia and being attacked while rescuing survivors.
 TSMS Laconia, 1929–1963, caught fire, evacuated and sank in 1963

See also
 Lacon (disambiguation)
 Laconia Car Company a one time American rolling stock builder